Schuelea is a genus of beetles in the family Carabidae, containing the following species:

 Schuelea arfakensis (Baehr, 1987)
 Schuelea drumonti Baehr, 2004
 Schuelea monstrosa Baehr, 2004

References

Anthiinae (beetle)